Palmyrene may refer to:

 an inhabitant of ancient Palmyra, Syria
 Palmyrene alphabet
 Palmyrene Aramaic
 Palmyrene Empire
 Palmyrene (Unicode block)

Language and nationality disambiguation pages